WFBS-LP (107.9 FM, Sunny 107.9) is an American low power FM radio station licensed to serve the community of Salem, South Carolina, United States. The non-commercial radio station programs an oldies format mixed with Carolina Beach Music. The station is locally owned by Salem Radio Inc. (no connection to Salem Media Group).

History
WFBS-LP is notable for being one of several radio stations to suffer a foreign a hijacking attack on their computer-based automation system, when attackers took over the frequency and aired a continuous loop of "F*** Donald Trump" by YG (rapper) & Nipsey Hussle

References

External links

FBS-LP
FBS-LP
Oconee County, South Carolina